Temagami, formerly spelled as Timagami, is a municipality in Northeastern Ontario, Canada, in the District of Nipissing with Lake Temagami at its heart.

Temagami may also refer to:

Places
Temagami North, an unincorporated community in the above municipality
Temagami railway station, located in the above municipality
Temagami River, located in the Nipissing District of the province of Ontario.
Lake Temagami, source of the above river
Temagami Island, located in the above lake
Temagami Water Aerodrome
Temagami/Mine Landing Water Aerodrome

Geology
Temagami Greenstone Belt
Temagami Magnetic Anomaly
Copperfields Mine, originally known as Temagami Mine, located on Temagami Island
Temagamite, discovered in the above mine

People
Temagami First Nation

See also
 Timiskaming (disambiguation), word from the same Algonquin root